The Sinful People of Prague was a Czechoslovak television programme which was first broadcast in 1968. The programme was written and directed by Jiří Sequens. The thirteen-part series is an adaptation of Jiří Marek's short stories from the collections Panoptikum starých kriminálních příběhů (Panopticon of Old Criminal Stories) and Panoptikum hříšných lidí (Panopticon of Sinful People). The story takes place around 1928. The series wasloosely followed by four feature films and one television film (all from 1971–1972) and the television series Panoptikum města pražského (1988).

Plot
Criminalists from Prague's "Ctyřka", i.e. IV. security department, investigate serious criminal cases in Prague in the 20s of the 20th century under the leadership of high police counsel Vacátko. The so-called murder squad consists of inspectors Mrázek, Bouše and Brůžek. They are experienced detectives and have extensive knowledge of the Prague underworld, which often meets in an infamous pub Jedová chýše. Around 1928, they investigate murders, robberies, unexplained deaths and embezzlement, but also become involved in the case of stolen secret military documents.

Cast
Jaroslav Marvan as high police counsel Karel Vacátko
František Filipovský as inspector Václav Mrázek
Josef Vinklář as inspector Josef Bouše
Josef Bláha as inspector Josef Brůžek

External links 
 CSFD.cz - Hříšní lidé města pražského
 

Czechoslovak television series
1968 Czechoslovak television series debuts
Czech crime television series
Czech drama television series
1960s Czechoslovak television series
Czechoslovak Television original programming